The Shire of Inglewood was a local government area of Queensland, Australia on the Queensland-New South Wales border in the Darling Downs region, about halfway between the towns of Goondiwindi and Warwick.

History 

The Inglewood Division was created on 11 November 1879 as one of 74 divisions around Queensland under the Divisional Boards Act 1879 with a population of 1378.

Following a petition by residents, the Rosenthal Division was created on 18 April 1889 under the Divisional Boards Act 1879 from Subdivision No. 1 of the Inglewood Division.
 
With the passage of the Local Authorities Act 1902, Inglewood Division became the Shire of Inglewood on 31 March 1903.

On 15 March 2008, under the Local Government (Reform Implementation) Act 2007 passed by the Parliament of Queensland on 10 August 2007, the Shire of Inglewood was merged with the Shire of Waggamba and the Town of Goondiwindi to form the Goondiwindi Region.

Major industries in the Shire included beef cattle, grains, fruit, olives, tobacco, and wool growing.

Towns and localities 
The Shire of Inglewood included the following settlements:

Towns:
 Gore
 Inglewood
 Silver Spur
 Texas
State forests:
 Bringalily State Forest
 Yelarbon State Forest

Localities:
 Beebo
 Bonshaw
 Brush Creek
 Bybera
 Coolmunda
 Glenarbon
 Greenup
 Limevale
 Maidenhead
 Mosquito Creek
 Oman Ama
 Riverton
 Smithlea
 Terrica
 Warroo
 Watsons Crossing
 Whetstone

Chairmen and mayors
 1927: W. J. Tomkins
 2007-2007: Joan White (first female mayor)

Population

References

External links 
 

Former local government areas of Queensland
Darling Downs
1879 establishments in Australia
2008 disestablishments in Australia
Populated places disestablished in 2008